H. legrandi may refer to a few different species.  The specific epithet legrandi refers to someone with the surname 'Legrand'

 Hypotacha legrandi, a species of moth in the family Erebidae
 Halenia legrandi, a species of foram